The Cryptobasidiaceae are a family of fungi in the Basidiomycota, Exobasidiales order. Species in the family have a widespread distribution, especially in neotropical areas. Members of the Cryptobasidiaceae are plant pathogens that grow parasitically on the leaves, stems and fruits of plants, especially those in the family Lauraceae.

References

Ustilaginomycotina
Fungal plant pathogens and diseases
Basidiomycota families